Gary Brian Kibbe (January 9, 1941 – March 9, 2020) was an American cinematographer. He was born in Los Angeles, California.

Kibbe collaborated frequently with director John Carpenter, shooting the majority of the director's films since 1987's Prince of Darkness. He also worked on films such as RoboCop 3 and Double Dragon.

Kibbe became a member of the American Society of Cinematographers in 1997.

Filmography
Feature films
 Prince of Darkness (1987)
 They Live (1988)
 RoboCop 3 (1993)
 Double Dragon (1994)
 In the Mouth of Madness (1994)
 Village of the Damned (1995)
 Escape from L.A. (1996)
 Vampires (1998)
 Ghosts of Mars (2001)
 The Librarians (2003)

Television films
 Two-Fisted Tales (1992)
 Body Bags (1993)

Television series
 Tales from the Crypt (1992)

References

External links
 

1941 births
2020 deaths
American cinematographers
Film people from Los Angeles